Koopmansfontein is a village 61 km north-west of Barkly West, 115 km east of Postmasburg, between Kimberley and Hotazel. Said to have been named after a Griqua called Koopman, who lived at the fountain.

References

Populated places in the Dikgatlong Local Municipality